"Highest in the Room" (stylized in all caps) is a song by American rapper Travis Scott. It was released as a single on October 4, 2019. It was released in a variety of formats, including on 7-inch vinyl, cassette and as a CD single. In its first week, it debuted atop the Billboard Hot 100, for the chart dated October 19, 2019, becoming Scott's second US number-one single, following "Sicko Mode". A remix featuring Spanish singer Rosalía and American rapper Lil Baby was released on December 27, 2019, and featured on Scott and other Cactus Jack members' compilation album JackBoys (2019) on the same day, while the original release remains off the compilation. The remix version was released to Italian contemporary hit radio on January 7, 2020. The song received a nomination for Best Melodic Rap Performance at the 63rd Annual Grammy Awards.

Background
The song was first used in Scott's girlfriend Kylie Jenner's "Kybrows" commercial on April 29, 2019, before Scott debuted the song during his set at the Rolling Loud festival in Miami on May 10–12, 2019. On August 31, 2019, Scott played a portion of the song at a concert that included a verse from Lil Baby, but was ultimately cut in the final version because Scott wanted to express the breakup with himself and Jenner on his own. The demo version featuring Baby leaked on December 24, 2019. Baby's verse was on the remix of the song, which is on the compilation album JackBoys. However, the original version of "Highest in the Room" did not make it onto the album.

Promotion
Scott officially announced the track's release through social media on September 30, posting three covers for the song as well as a pre-order link and captioning the post "See u on the 4th".

A music video was released on October 4, 2019, on YouTube, directed by Dave Meyers and Travis Scott himself, while it was produced by Nathan Scherrer, Randy Donaldson, and Sam 
Lecca.

Commercial performance
"Highest in the Room" debuted at number one on the Billboard Hot 100 on the issue dated October 19, 2019, becoming Scott's second number-one single on the chart (after 2018's "Sicko Mode"), his first number-one single on its first week on the chart, and 35th single to debut at the number one position in the chart's history. "Highest in the Room" debuted atop the Streaming Songs chart with 59 million streams and debuted at number two on the Digital Songs chart with 51,000 downloads. The song fell to number six the following week on October 26, 2019. It later returned to the top 10 on the issue dated January 11, 2020 at number eight, partly charged by sales from the remix featuring Rosalia and Lil Baby. Elsewhere, in Greece the song charted at number one. The UK Singles Chart number two on 17 October.

Personnel
Credits adapted from Tidal.

 Travis Scott – vocalist, songwriting
 OZ – production, songwriting
 Nik D – production, songwriting
 Mike Dean – co-production, mixing, mastering
 Sean Solymar – engineering assistant
 Jimmy Cash – engineering assistant

Charts

Weekly charts

Year-end charts

Certifications

Release history

Rosalía and Lil Baby remix

A remix featuring Spanish singer Rosalía and American rapper Lil Baby was released on December 27, 2019. It was the first track on Scott and other Cactus Jack members' album, JackBoys, which was released on the same day. Originally, Lil Baby was supposed to be on the original song, but his verse was cut for unknown reasons. The remix version received a radio release on January 7, 2020.

Charts

Certifications

Release history

References

2019 singles
2019 songs
Billboard Hot 100 number-one singles
Canadian Hot 100 number-one singles
Number-one singles in Greece
Travis Scott songs
Music videos directed by Dave Meyers (director)
Songs written by Mike Dean (record producer)
Songs written by Travis Scott
Epic Records singles
Grand Hustle Records singles
Cactus Jack Records singles
Songs written by Oz (record producer)
Rosalía songs
Songs about cannabis
Songs about drugs